"Always Tomorrow" is a song by Cuban American singer and songwriter Gloria Estefan, released worldwide on October 12, 1992 as the first single by Epic Records from her compilation album, Greatest Hits. The song is written by Estefan and produced by her husband Emilio Estefan, Jr., Jorge Casas and Clay Ostwald. It is a guitar-driven acoustic ballad about starting over in the wake of tragedy or disaster. While on tour, Estefan has played the guitar while singing the song. She donated royalties from single sales to the victims of Hurricane Andrew. In 2005, the song was featured in a medley with her No. 1 smash "Coming Out of the Dark" in the compilation "Hurricane Relief: Come Together now", created for Hurricane Katrina relief.

Critical reception
Larry Flick from Billboard described the song as a "earnest, thoughtful ballad", and noted further that Estefan's "warm and distinctive alto floats lightly over an arrangement of acoustic guitar strumming and soft, swirling strings." Randy Clark from Cashbox stated, "The message on this inspirational, richly orchestrated track should at least offer an uplifting musical glimmer of hope in the now familiar Estefan ballad fashion". Dave Sholin from the Gavin Report said it is "combining an uplifting message and melody". Another editor called it "hopeful and worthy five minutes of class."

Music video
A music video was produced to promote the single. It is one of Estefan's simplest clips, focusing on how the victims of Hurricane Andrew rebuilt Miami. It was later published on Estefan's official YouTube channel in October 2009. The video has amassed more than 1,8 million views as of October 2021.

Charts

Weekly charts

Year-end charts

Track listings

Official versions
Original Versions
 Album Version  — 4:37
 The New Mix  — 4:31

Release history

References

1990s ballads
1992 singles
Gloria Estefan songs
Songs written by Gloria Estefan
1992 songs
Epic Records singles
Pop ballads
Song recordings produced by Emilio Estefan